For other uses, see Shadow Mountain (disambiguation)

The Shadow Mountains are located in the Mojave Desert of eastern California in the United States. The mountains lie in a generally north–south direction south of the Kingston Range and east of the Avawatz Mountains and the Silurian Hills.

An isolated peak named Shadow Mountain is located about six miles due east of the main chain of the range. The Mojave National Preserve lies to the south and east.

The Eastern Star Mine is located at the western edge of the range, and the Kingston Spring is found in the northwestern part of the mountains. The Shadow Mountains lie to the north of the small community of Halloran Springs, next to Interstate 15.

See also
Other ranges in the local area include the:
 Avawatz Mountains
 Salt Spring Hills
 Silurian Hills
 Sperry Hills

References

 California Road and Recreation Atlas, 2005, p. 97.

Mountain ranges of the Mojave Desert
Mountain ranges of San Bernardino County, California